Carlo Ricardo Prater (born June 25, 1981) is a Brazilian professional mixed martial artist currently competing in the Welterweight division. A professional MMA competitor since 2002, Prater has also formerly competed for the UFC, WEC, Strikeforce, the MFC, Vale Tudo Japan, the Palace Fighting Championship, Legacy FC, and Titan FC.

Background
Born in Sao Paulo, Brazil, Prater was raised along with his younger sister by parents who had been American missionaries in Brazil since the 1970s. Prater's father took a pulpit job in Connecticut, resulting in the family to move to the United States. Prater was enrolled in Tang Soon Do upon moving to the U.S. in 1987, which he continued training in for three years. After his parents divorced, Prater moved with his father to Oklahoma in 1993 and began competing in wrestling. After viewing the first UFC events, Prater began training in Brazilian jiu-jitsu and judo while he was also wrestling. Having excelled, Prater was recruited by MMA fighter and grappler Jeff Lindsey before moving back to Brazil in 1998. Still in high school, Prater also began training in Luta Livre as well as boxing and kickboxing. In 2000, Prater went to Thailand where he began competing in Muay Thai before later transitioning to competing in professional mixed martial arts, moving to Texas to train with Yves Edwards.

Mixed martial arts career

Early career
Prater would make his debut as an amateur on March 28, 1998, when he faced David Hargrove at USWF 8. He lost via first-round TKO.

Prater made his professional debut in November 2002. Over the next year, he amassed an undefeated record of 10–0. He experienced his first professional loss to Drew Fickett in April 2004. During his early career, Prater collected a notable win when he submitted future WEC Welterweight Champion and UFC Interim Welterweight Champion Carlos Condit by triangle choke.

World Extreme Cagefighting
In early 2008, Prater again faced Carlos Condit at WEC 32, when Condit was the WEC welterweight champion. In the rematch, Condit won via submission in the first round.

Prater then faced fellow former title challenger Brock Larson at WEC 35. He lost the fight via first-round TKO, and was subsequently released from the promotion.

Strikeforce
Prater made his Strikeforce debut against Bryan Travers at Strikeforce Challengers: Beerbohm vs. Healy. He won the fight via technical submission in the first round.

Ultimate Fighting Championship
Prater made his debut for the Ultimate Fighting Championship at UFC 142. He stepped in as a replacement for Siyar Bahadurzada against fellow Brazilian Erick Silva. Prater looked to have originally lost the bout via TKO due to punches at 0:29 seconds in first round. However, Silva was disqualified for landing illegal punches to the back of Prater's head.

Prater faced Canadian T. J. Grant on May 15, 2012, at UFC on Fuel TV: Korean Zombie vs. Poirier. Grant defeated Prater via unanimous decision.

Prater lost to Marcus LeVesseur on October 5, 2012, at UFC on FX 5 via split decision. After this loss, he was subsequently released from the promotion.

Legacy FC
Prater made his LFC debut on July 22, 2011, when he faced Cameron Dollar at LFC 7. He won the fight via second-round kimura submission. Following a short stint in the UFC, Prater returned to face Carlos Diego Ferreira at LFC 20 on May 31, 2013. Prater lost the fight via unanimous decision.

Titan Fighting Championship
Prater has signed with Titan Fighting Championship. He made his promotional debut at Titan FC 32 on December 19, 2014, against Rick Hawn and lost the fight by unanimous decision.

Personal life
Prater is married and has a son.

Championships and accomplishments
Palace Fighting Championship
PFC World Lightweight Championship (One time)

Mixed martial arts record

|-
|Loss
|align=center|35–24–1
|Alexander Butenko
|TKO (submission to strikes)
|RFA 5
|
|align=center|1
|align=center|1:48
|Brno, Czech Republic
|
|-
|Loss
|align=center|35–23–1
|Nikola Joksović
|Decision (unanimous)
|FNC Armagedon 3 Semifinals
|
|align=center|3
|align=center|5:00
|Zabok, Croatia
|
|-
|Win
|align=center|35–22–1
|Cesar Benitez
|Submission (anaconda choke)
|Centro Oeste Fight 14
|
|align=center|1
|align=center|1:20
|Brasília, Brazil
|
|-
|Loss
|align=center|34–22–1
|Bojan Veličković
|TKO (punches)
|OKTAGON 27
|
|align=center|1
|align=center|2:44
|Novo Mesto, Slovakia
|
|-
| Loss
| align=center| 34–21–1
| Stefan Sekulić
|Decision (unanimous)
| Serbian Battle Championship 32
| 
| align=center| 3
| align=center| 5:00
| Bački Petrovac, Serbia
|
|-
| Win
| align=center| 34–20–1
| Cristiano Bonis
| KO (punch)
| King of Ring MMA 2
| 
| align=center| 1
| align=center| 1:09
| Brasilia, Brazil
|
|-
| Loss
| align=center| 33–20–1
| Justin Edwards
| Submission (guillotine choke)
| Premier MMA Championship 9
| 
| align=center| 3
| align=center| 1:44
| Covington, Kentucky, United States
|
|-
| Win
| align=center| 33–19–1
| Eric Scallan
| Submission (arm-triangle choke)
| Legacy Fighting Alliance 32
| 
| align=center| 2
| align=center| 3:39
| Lake Charles, Louisiana, United States
| 
|-
| Win
| align=center| 32–19–1
| Evan Samad
| Decision (split)
| Premier MMA Championship 5: Prater vs. Samad
| 
| align=center| 3
| align=center| 5:00
| Covington, Kentucky, United States
| 
|-
| Loss
| align=center| 31–19–1
| Jason Norwood
| Decision (unanimous)
| Fury FC 19
| 
| align=center| 3
| align=center| 5:00
| Humble, Texas, United States
|Return to Welterweight.
|-
| Loss
| align=center| 31–18–1
| Erivan Pereira
| Decision (majority)
| Aspera FC 45
| 
| align=center| 3
| align=center| 5:00
| Brasília, Brazil
|
|-
| Loss
| align=center| 31–17–1
| Dylan Fussell
| Decision (split)
| WSOF Global Championship 1
| 
| align=center| 3
| align=center| 5:00
| Hainan, China
| 
|-
| Loss
| align=center| 31–16–1
| Robert White
| Decision (split)
| Absolute Action 43
| 
| align=center| 3
| align=center| 5:00
| Highland Heights, Kentucky, United States
| 
|-
| Loss
| align=center| 31–15–1
| Rick Hawn
| Decision (unanimous)
| Titan FC 32
| 
| align=center| 3
| align=center| 5:00
| Lowell, Massachusetts, United States
| 
|-
| Loss
| align=center| 31–14–1
| Carlos Diego Ferreira
| Decision (unanimous)
| Legacy FC 20: Prater vs. Ferreira
| 
| align=center| 3
| align=center| 5:00
| Corpus Christi, Texas United States
| 
|-
| Win
| align=center| 31–13–1
| Sebastian Latorre
| Submission (kimura)
| Fight Now Championship
| 
| align=center| 1
| align=center| N/A
| Maceio, Brazil
| 
|-
| Loss
| align=center| 30–13–1
| Kuniyoshi Hironaka
| Decision (unanimous)
| Vale Tudo Japan 2012
| 
| align=center| 3
| align=center| 5:00
| Tokyo, Japan
| 
|-
| Loss
| align=center| 30–12–1
| Marcus LeVesseur
| Decision (split)
| UFC on FX: Browne vs. Bigfoot
| 
| align=center| 3
| align=center| 5:00
| Minneapolis, Minnesota, United States
| 
|-
| Loss
| align=center| 30–11–1
| T. J. Grant
| Decision (unanimous)
| UFC on Fuel TV: Korean Zombie vs. Poirier
| 
| align=center| 3
| align=center| 5:00
| Fairfax, Virginia, United States
| 
|-
| Win
| align=center| 30–10–1
| Erick Silva
| DQ (punches to the back of the head)
| UFC 142
| 
| align=center| 1
| align=center| 0:29
| Rio de Janeiro, Brazil
| 
|-
|  Win
| align=center| 29–10–1
| Gleristone Santos
| Submission (arm-triangle choke)
| Capital Fight 4
| 
| align=center| 2
| align=center| 4:58
| Brasília, Brazil
| 
|-
|  Win
| align=center| 28–10–1
| Cameron Dollar
| Submission (kimura)
| Legacy FC 7: Prater vs. Dollar
| 
| align=center| 2
| align=center| 1:53
| Houston, Texas, United States
| 
|-
|  Win
| align=center| 27–10–1
| Henrique Mello
| Submission (rear-naked choke)
| International Fighter Championship
| 
| align=center| 1
| align=center| 0:50
| Recife, Brazil
| 
|-
|  Win
| align=center| 26–10–1
| Bryan Travers
| Technical submission (inverted anaconda choke)
| Strikeforce Challengers: Beerbohm vs. Healy
| 
| align=center| 1
| align=center| 0:38
| Cedar Park, Texas, United States
| 
|-
| Loss
| align=center| 25–10–1
| Reza Madadi
| Decision (unanimous)
| Superior Challenge 6
| 
| align=center| 3
| align=center| 5:00
| Stockholm, Sweden
| 
|-
| Loss
| align=center| 25–9–1
| Drew Fickett
| Submission (rear-naked choke)
| Shine: Lightweight Grand Prix
| 
| align=center| 1
| align=center| 2:02
| Newkirk, Oklahoma, United States
| 
|-
| Win
| align=center| 25–8–1
| Charlie Brown
| Decision (majority)
| Shine: Lightweight Grand Prix
| 
| align=center| 2
| align=center| 5:00
| Newkirk, Oklahoma, United States
| 
|-
| Loss
| align=center| 24–8–1
| Richard Crunkilton
| Decision (split)
| Shine: Lightweight Grand Prix
| 
| align=center| 3
| align=center| 5:00
| Newkirk, Oklahoma, United States
| 
|-
| Loss
| align=center| 24–7–1
| Antonio McKee
| Decision (unanimous)
| MFC 22
| 
| align=center| 3
| align=center| 5:00
| Edmonton, Alberta, Canada
| 
|-
| Win
| align=center| 24–6–1
| Dominique Robinson
| Decision (unanimous)
| PFC 13: Validation
| 
| align=center| 5
| align=center| 3:00
| Lemoore, California, United States
| 
|-
| Loss
| align=center| 23–6–1
| Brock Larson
| TKO (punches)
| WEC 35: Condit vs. Miura
| 
| align=center| 1
| align=center| 0:37
| Las Vegas, Nevada, United States
| 
|-
| Win
| align=center| 23–5–1
| Garett Davis
| Decision (unanimous)
| Raw Combat: Resurrection
| 
| align=center| 3
| align=center| 5:00
| Calgary, Alberta, Canada
| 
|-
| Win
| align=center| 22–5–1
| Marcelo Brito
| Decision (unanimous)
| UWC: Invasion
| 
| align=center| 3
| align=center| 5:00
| Fairfax, Virginia, United States
| 
|-
| Loss
| align=center| 21–5–1
| Carlos Condit
| Submission (guillotine choke)
| WEC 32: Condit vs. Prater
| 
| align=center| 1
| align=center| 3:48
| Rio Rancho, New Mexico, United States
| 
|-
| Win
| align=center| 21–4–1
| Keith Wisniewski
| Decision (split)
| Art of War 3
| 
| align=center| 3
| align=center| 5:00
| Dallas, Texas, United States
| 
|-
| Win
| align=center| 20–4–1
| Anthony Lapsley
| Decision (unanimous)
| Art of War 1
| 
| align=center| 3
| align=center| 5:00
| Dallas, Texas, United States
| 
|-
| Win
| align=center| 19–4–1
| Marlon Mathias
| TKO (stomps)
| Storm Samurai 12
| 
| align=center| 1
| align=center| 4:55
| Curitiba, Parana, Brazil
| 
|-
| Loss
| align=center| 18–4–1
| Derrick Noble
| Decision (unanimous)
| Mix FC: Boardwalk Blitz
| 
| align=center| 3
| align=center| 5:00
| Atlantic City, New Jersey, United States
| 
|-
| Win
| align=center| 18–3–1
| Pat Healy
| Submission (arm-triangle choke)
| Euphoria: USA vs. Japan
| 
| align=center| 2
| align=center| 3:57
| Atlantic City, New Jersey, United States
| 
|-
| Win
| align=center| 17–3–1
| Adam Arredondo
| Submission (rear-naked choke)
| IFC: Rumble on the Rio 2
| 
| align=center| 1
| align=center| 3:03
| McAllen, Texas, United States
| 
|-
| Loss
| align=center| 16–3–1
| Keith Wisniewski
| Decision (unanimous)
| FFC 15: Fiesta Las Vegas
| 
| align=center| 3
| align=center| 5:00
| Las Vegas, Nevada, United States
| 
|-
| Win
| align=center| 16–2–1
| Claudionor Fontinelle
| Submission (anaconda choke)
| Meca World Vale Tudo 12
| 
| align=center| 1
| align=center| 3:52
| Rio de Janeiro, Brazil
| 
|-
| Win
| align=center| 15–2–1
| Mikey Gomez
| Decision (unanimous)
| Absolute Fighting Championships 11
| 
| align=center| 2
| align=center| 5:00
| Ft. Lauderdale, Florida, United States
| 
|-
| Loss
| align=center| 14–2–1
| Keith Wisniewski
| Decision (unanimous)
| Freestyle Fighting Championships 13
| 
| align=center| 3
| align=center| 5:00
| Biloxi, Mississippi, United States
| 
|-
| Win
| align=center| 14–1–1
| Thomas Schulte
| Decision (unanimous)
| Fightworld 3
| 
| align=center| 3
| align=center| 5:00
| Albuquerque, New Mexico, United States
| 
|-
| Win
| align=center| 13–1–1
| Efrain Ruiz
| Decision (unanimous)
| Absolute Fighting Championships 10
| 
| align=center| 2
| align=center| 5:00
| Ft. Lauderdale, Florida, United States
| 
|-
| Win
| align=center| 12–1–1
| Carlos Condit
| Submission (triangle choke)
| Fightworld 2
| 
| align=center| 1
| align=center| 2:51
| Albuquerque, New Mexico, United States
| 
|-
| Win
| align=center| 11–1–1
| Spencer Fisher
| Decision (unanimous)
| Freestyle Fighting Championships 9
| 
| align=center| 3
| align=center| 5:00
| Biloxi, Mississippi, United States
| 
|-
| Loss
| align=center| 10–1–1
| Drew Fickett
| Submission (guillotine choke)
| Rage on the River
| 
| align=center| 3
| align=center| 2:25
| Redding, California, United States
| 
|-
| Draw
| align=center| 10–0–1
| Sauli Heilimo
| Draw
| Absolute Fighting Championships 7
| 
| align=center| 2
| align=center| 5:00
| Ft. Lauderdale, Florida, United States
| 
|-
| Win
| align=center| 10–0
| Melvin Guillard
| Submission (guillotine choke)
| Freestyle Fighting Championships 7
| 
| align=center| 1
| align=center| 2:32
| Biloxi, Mississippi, United States
| 
|-
| Win
| align=center| 9–0
| Andrew Chappelle
| Decision
| IFC: Rumble on the Rio
| 
| align=center| 3
| align=center| 5:00
| Hidalgo, Texas, United States
| 
|-
| Win
| align=center| 8–0
| Chris Mills
| Submission (guillotine choke)
| Reality Fighting Championships 2
| 
| align=center| 1
| align=center| 1:04
| Oklahoma City, Oklahoma, United States
| 
|-
| Win
| align=center| 7–0
| Lee King
| Submission (armbar)
| Renegades Extreme Fighting
| 
| align=center| 1
| align=center| N/A
| Houston, Texas, United States
| 
|-
| Win
| align=center| 6–0
| Adam Arredondo
| TKO (injury)
| Renegades Extreme Fighting
| 
| align=center| 1
| align=center| 0:17
| Houston, Texas, United States
| 
|-
| Win
| align=center| 5–0
| Lee King
| Submission (guillotine choke)
| Renegades Extreme Fighting
| 
| align=center| 1
| align=center| 1:04
| Houston, Texas, United States
| 
|-
| Win
| align=center| 4–0
| Jeremiah O'Neal
| Submission (armbar)
| Renegades Extreme Fighting
| 
| align=center| 1
| align=center| 1:22
| Houston, Texas, United States
| 
|-
| Win
| align=center| 3–0
| Teo Baumgardner
| Submission (guillotine choke)
| Reality Fighting Championships 1
| 
| align=center| 1
| align=center| 4:22
| Oklahoma City, Oklahoma, United States
| 
|-
| Win
| align=center| 2–0
| Andrew Chappelle
| Submission (rear-naked choke)
| Talon Challenge 3
| 
| align=center| N/A
| align=center| N/A
| Corpus Christi, Texas, United States
| 
|-
| Win
| align=center| 1–0
| Frank Alcala
| Submission (armbar)
| Talon Challenge 3
| 
| align=center| N/A
| align=center| N/A
| Corpus Christi, Texas, United States
|

Amateur mixed martial arts record

|Loss
|align=center| 0–1
|David Hargrove
|TKO (punches)
|Unified Shoot Wrestling Federation 8
|
|align=center| 1
|align=center| 1:40
|Texas, United States
|

References

External links
 
 

Brazilian male mixed martial artists
Lightweight mixed martial artists
Brazilian people of German descent
Welterweight mixed martial artists
Mixed martial artists utilizing catch wrestling
Mixed martial artists utilizing Luta Livre
Mixed martial artists utilizing judo
Mixed martial artists utilizing Brazilian jiu-jitsu
Brazilian expatriate sportspeople in the United States
Brazilian catch wrestlers
Brazilian practitioners of Brazilian jiu-jitsu
People awarded a black belt in Brazilian jiu-jitsu
Brazilian male judoka
Living people
1981 births
Ultimate Fighting Championship male fighters